Beth Rivkah Ladies College or Beth Rivkah Lubavitch is an Orthodox Jewish, comprehensive, primary and secondary day school for girls, located on Balaclava Road, East St Kilda in Melbourne, Australia.

Established in 1956 and managed by the Chabad-Lubavitch movement's Yeshivah Centre, it goes from kindergarten to Year 12. Most of its students come from non-Chabad families.

Shimon Waronker became the principal in 2020.

See also

Torah study

External links
 

Chabad schools
Girls' schools in Victoria (Australia)
Hasidic Judaism in Australia
Orthodox Jewish schools for women
Jews and Judaism in Melbourne
Jewish schools in Melbourne
Educational institutions established in 1956
1956 establishments in Australia
Orthodox yeshivas in Australia
St Kilda East, Victoria
Buildings and structures in the City of Port Phillip